IconBuilder is a popular plugin for Adobe Photoshop,  Adobe Photoshop Elements and Macromedia Fireworks for the editing and creation of computer icons created and used by The Iconfactory. It supports all icon sizes for both Mac OS X and Microsoft Windows. IconBuilder was created when there was no official tool from Apple Computer for making icons in the .icns format introduced by Mac OS 8.5.

The Windows version is at version 2.0, lagging far behind the Macintosh version. The Mac OS 9 version is frozen at 3.1. Version 8 adds support for Windows Vista's 256×256 icons.

Features
 Create icons of any size, up to 1,024×1,024 pixels.
 Supports Mac OS X icon drop state.
 Export to multiple file formats simultaneously.
 Import existing icons.
 File integrity checks.

See also
Icon editor
Favicon

References

 Leslie Ayers (7 June 2007) How to Make Your Own Icon, Mac Life, also appeared in print Mac How-To, Spring 2007, p. 86
 Steve Caplin (May 2003) IconBuilder Pro 4.0, MacUser Product Reviews

External links
 IconBuilder website
 Ko Maruyama (5 Oct 2005) IconBuilder 8 		The IconFactory lets you take a closer  look at art,  Digital Media Online

Icon software
The Iconfactory
Raster graphics editors
Macintosh graphics software
MacOS graphics software
Windows graphics-related software
2001 software
Adobe Photoshop